Berry High School is a high public high school located in Berry, Alabama. It provides education for students in grades 7-12.

History

Berry High School has burned down at least once in its history. The high school has two gyms and is an AHSAA 1A school. It is home to the Berry Wildcats and the Red Regiment Band.

Accomplishments 
The Berry Junior High football team has won the conference championship two years in a row.
The Berry FFA has placed first in the state FFA small engines two years in a row.

Sports 
Berry High School sports include baseball, football, basketball, volleyball, softball, and cheerleading.

Football coach Danny Raines left the school after allowing students to burn a trophy football.

In the 2020 Football season the varsity team made it to the semi finals where they lost to Pickens County.

External links
School Homepage

References

Public high schools in Alabama
Schools in Fayette County, Alabama
Public middle schools in Alabama